Shara may refer to:
Shara District, an administrative subdivision of Iran
Shara, Leh, a village in Jammu and Kashmir, India
Šar Mountains (Shar Mountains), colloquially Šara (Shara), Balkans
Shara (god), son of Inanna and brother of Lulal in Sumerian mythology
Shara (name), female given name
Shara (film), a 2003 Japanese film also known as Sharasojyu
Shara, a fictional land in Robert Jordan's The Wheel of Time series

See also 
 Šara (disambiguation)